Urho Armas Somersalmi (formerly Urho Sundell; 23 September 1888, Helsinki – 12 April 1962) was a Finnish actor.

Career

Somersalmi worked in the Finnish National Theatre from 1908 to 1958. He was often cast in the roles of masculine heroes or first-time lovers. His physical appearance was very suitable for such roles, and in the beginning of his career, he was often criticized for superficiality. Somersalmi was awarded the Pro Finlandia medal in 1948.

Somersalmi was involved in the Finnish film industry from the beginning. In 1913, he had his first small film role in a Teuvo Puro film Sylvi, the first Finnish drama film. His final appearance was in the Finnish-Soviet co-production film Sampo (1959) in which he played the role of Väinämöinen.

Personal life

Somersalmi married actress Aili Somersalmi in 1912. In April 1962, he killed her with an axe he had received as a gift from Finnish Actors' Union and stabbed her in the chest, after which he hanged himself.

Selected filmography

Sylvi (1913)
 Johan (1921)
Tukkijoella (1928)
 Charlotte Löwensköld (1930)
Pohjalaisia (1936)
Jääkärin morsian (1938)
Vaivaisukon morsian (1944)
Pimeänpirtin hävitys (1947)
Risti ja liekki (1957)
Sampo (1959)

References

External links

1888 births
1962 deaths
Male actors from Helsinki
People from Uusimaa Province (Grand Duchy of Finland)
Finnish male film actors
Finnish male silent film actors
20th-century Finnish male actors
Murder–suicides in Finland
Suicides by hanging in Finland
1962 suicides